Curtis Jerome Ricks (April 26, 1893 – April 28, 1961) was an American baseball pitcher in the Negro leagues. He played with the Cleveland Tate Stars, Chicago American Giants, and St. Louis Giants from 1922 to 1924.

References

External links
 and Seamheads

Chicago American Giants players
Cleveland Tate Stars players
St. Louis Giants (1924) players
1893 births
1961 deaths
Baseball players from Missouri
Baseball pitchers
20th-century African-American sportspeople